Akulaku is a Southeast Asian fintech unicorn that provides consumer credit, digital banking, wealth management, and insurance brokerage services.

History 
Akulaku was officially founded in 2016 by William Li  and Gordon Hu. Before it became Akalulu, the company began in 2014 by providing cross-border remittance services for domestic workers in Hong Kong as Silvrr before branching out to operate its online credit and e-commerce platform in Indonesia and the Philippines. In 2016, the company pivoted into a fintech company.

In 2019, Akulaku acquired an Indonesian bank called PT Bank Yudha Bhakti Tbk (BBYB) and later renamed it PT Bank Neo Commerce Tbk (BNC).

Funding 
In October 2018, Akulaku raised $70 million in series C investment from Sequoia India, with participation from existing investors. Ant Financial led Akulaku's Series D round of US$100 million in 2019.

The company raised $100 million in a strategic investment from Siam Commercial Bank (SCB) in 2022, following $125 million raised in 2021 with the participation of Silverhorn Group. With the SCB investment, Akulaku officially entered the unicorn club.
In 2022, Akulaku raised $200 million from Japan’s largest bank, Mitsubishi UFJ Financial Group (MUFG.)

References

External links 
Official Website
Akulaku Vietnam

Singaporean companies established in 2014
Companies of Singapore
Financial services companies of Singapore